Aldi Al Achya (born 11 April 1994) is an Indonesian tarkam footballer who plays as a winger and forward for Liga 2 club Bekasi City.

Club career

Persita Tangerang
Was born in Tangerang, Aldi started his professional career with Persita Tangerang on 2012.

Persija Jakarta (loan)
Aldi returned to the 2016 Indonesia Soccer Championship A, joining Persija Jakarta on loan from Persita Tangerang.

Honours

Club
Persita Tangerang
 Liga 2 runner-up: 2019

Individual
 Indonesia Super League U-21 Top Goalscorer: 2014 (16 goals)

References

External links
 Aldi Al Achya at Soccerway
 Aldi Al Achya at Liga Indonesia

1994 births
Indonesian footballers
Living people
Association football forwards
Persita Tangerang players
Persija Jakarta players
People from Tangerang
Sportspeople from Banten